Stanway is a village and civil parish in Essex, England near Colchester and within Colchester Borough. 'Stanway' is an Anglo-Saxon name for the 'stone way' of the Roman road, now the A12.

Colchester Zoo, The Stanway School, Graham Coxon and Damon Albarn, founder members of Blur, met at the local school, The Stanway School.

Stanway is mentioned in the Domesday Book of 1086.

The £4.3m A12 bypass opened in 1970. Local pubs include the Princess Charlotte (the first pub in the UK to be named after Princess Charlotte of Wales) and the Swan on London Road, and Live and Let Live on Millers Lane.

There are five schools – three primary schools,Lexden Springs School and The Stanway School which has academy status, and describes itself as a "Humanities and Maths & Computing College". Four of the five schools are close together, on adjacent roads with the third primary behind the Tollgate shopping centre.

An ever-expanding shopping district comprising The Tollgate Centre and Stane Park occupies an area close to the A12, these centres are home to national retailers such as B&Q, Sainsbury's, Homebase, Next and Marks and Spencer (having closed its city centre store in 2022). Further shops and businesses such as the Co-op, Halfords and Hatfields occupy the Peartree road area,

Governance
An electoral ward with the same name exists. The population of this ward at the 2011 census was 8,283.

Parish church

In the early Middle Ages Stanway had two churches; All Saints' next to Stanway Hall, and St Albright's in Little Stanway on the London Road (now the B1408). All Saints' church, first recorded in about 1260, had fallen out of use during the 16th century, but was repaired and the chancel and north aisle were demolished in about 1605 by Sir John Swinterton, when it became the private chapel to Stanway Hall. In the early 18th century the church was said to be "utterly decayed" and remains a ruin.

The current Church of England parish church is dedicated to Saint Albright, who is generally identified with Saint Ethelbert the King, a king of the Anglo-Saxon kingdom of East Anglia, who was killed in 794 AD. It was in existence in the late 11th century and was a parish church soon afterwards but was referred to as a chapel in later documents. The oldest parts of the present building date from the 12th century and incorporate Roman bricks in the heads of some of the windows. A new chancel was added in 1880 when the church was restored by George Gilbert Scott.

Druid of Colchester
In 1996, before the expansion of the Stanway sand and gravel quarry, an archaeological team was called in to investigate the outline of five ancient ditched enclosures identified by aerial photography. There, just off the A12 to Colchester, they discovered the grave of the "Druid of Colchester".

Sport and leisure

Stanway has a Non-League football club Stanway Rovers F.C. who play at New Farm Road.

References

External links

Civil parishes in Essex
Villages in Essex
Colchester (town)
Borough of Colchester